Momence Township may refer to one of the following places in the United States:

 Momence Township, Kankakee County, Illinois
 Momence Township, Fillmore County, Nebraska

Township name disambiguation pages